Lycée René Cassin may refer to:

Schools in France:
 Lycée René Cassin in Arpajon
 Lycée René Cassin in Bayonne
 Lycée René Cassin in Gonesse
 Lycée René Cassin in Le Raincy
 Lycée René Cassin in Mâcon
 Lycée René Cassin in Metz
 Lycée René Cassin in Montfort-sur-Meu
 Lycée René Cassin in Noisiel
 Lycée René Cassin in Strasbourg

Schools outside of France:
 Lycée Français René Cassin d'Oslo